Dame Clara Ellen Butt  (1 February 1872 – 23 January 1936) was an English dramatic contralto and one of the most popular singers from the 1890s through to the 1920s. She had an exceptionally fine contralto voice and an agile singing technique, and impressed contemporary composers such as Saint-Saëns and Elgar; the latter composed his Sea Pictures, Op. 37 with her voice in mind.

Her main career was as a recitalist and concert singer. She appeared in only two operatic productions, both of Gluck's Orfeo ed Euridice. Later in her career she frequently appeared in recitals together with her husband, the baritone Kennerley Rumford. She made numerous recordings for the gramophone.

Early life and career
Clara Butt was born in Southwick, Sussex, the eldest daughter of Henry Albert Butt, a sea captain, and his wife Clara née Hook. In 1880, the family moved to the port city of Bristol in England's West Country. Clara was educated at South Bristol High School, where her singing ability was recognised and her talent as a performer encouraged. At the request of her headmistress, she was trained by the bass Daniel Rootham (father of the composer Cyril Rootham) and joined the Bristol Festival Chorus, of which Daniel Rootham was musical director.

Butt won a scholarship to the Royal College of Music (RCM) in January 1890. Her voice teachers were John Henry Blower and Albert Visetti, while her piano teacher was Marmaduke Barton. During her fourth year of vocal lessons at the college she spent three months studying in Paris sponsored by Queen Victoria. She also studied in Berlin and Italy.

She made her professional debut on 7 December 1892 at the Royal Albert Hall in London in Sullivan's cantata The Golden Legend. Three days later she appeared as Orfeo in Gluck's Orfeo ed Euridice at the Lyceum Theatre. This was an RCM production, conducted by Charles Villiers Stanford. Bernard Shaw, who was then the music critic for The World, wrote that she "far surpassed the utmost expectations that could reasonably be entertained", and forecast a considerable career for her.

Later she polished her skills in Berlin with the famous retired soprano Etelka Gerster. The French composer Camille Saint-Saëns heard her, and wanted her to study his opera Samson et Dalila, but at the time the representation of biblical subjects on the British stage was forbidden, and nothing came of it. When the law changed and the work was given at Covent Garden in 1909 the part of Delila was sung by Kirkby Lunn, to Butt's disappointment. In 1896 she took a break from singing and returned to Paris for further vocal studies, this time under Jacques Bouhy. 

Butt acquired a reputation in Britain for her vocal attributes and her physical presence on the concert platform: she was 6 feet 2 inches tall. She made many gramophone recordings, often accompanied by the (uncredited) pianist Lilian Bryant. Among her recordings are several of Sullivan's song "The Lost Chord"; her friend Fanny Ronalds bequeathed the original manuscript of the song to her. She was primarily a concert singer; her only operatic performances were in two productions of Orfeo ed Euridice. Britain's leading composer of the era, Edward Elgar, composed his song-cycle Sea Pictures for contralto and orchestra with her in mind as soloist; she sang at the first performance of the work at the Norwich Festival on 5 October 1899, with the composer conducting.

Later life

On 26 June 1900 Butt married the baritone Kennerley Rumford and thereafter would often appear with him in concerts. They had two sons and a daughter. Besides singing in many important festivals and concerts, Butt appeared by royal command before Queen Victoria, King Edward VII, and King George V. She made tours of Australia, Japan, Canada, New Zealand, the United States and to many European cities.

During the First World War, Butt organised and sang in many concerts for service charities, and for this was appointed Dame Commander of the Order of the British Empire (DBE) in the 1920 civilian war honours. That year she sang four performances of Gluck's Orfeo ed Euridice at Covent Garden, with Miriam Licette, under the baton of Sir Thomas Beecham. According to The Times she was ill at ease on stage, and in the most famous number, "Che farò", her "attempt to sing it dramatically made her play fast and loose with the time and spoil the phrasing". It was her only appearance on the professional operatic stage.

Clara Butt performed 110 times at the Royal Albert Hall in her career, organising many important fund-raising concerts for charities during the First World War.

Butt's three sisters were also singers. One, Ethel Hook, became a famous contralto in her own right, made some solo recordings, and in 1926 appeared in an early sound film made in the Lee de Forest Phonofilm sound-on-film process.

She was clouded by tragedy in her later years, with both her sons predeceasing her. During the 1920s, she became seriously ill with spinal cancer. Nevertheless, she continued to give concerts and make records. A devout Christian Scientist, she took part in revivalist meetings, singing, and giving sermons. She died at North Stoke on 23 January 1936.

See also
Daisy Tapley - African American contralto
List of English Heritage blue plaques in the London Borough of Camden

Notes

References

Sources

Further reading
Andrea Suhm-Binder's biography page
Winifred Ponder, Clara Butt – Her Life-Story, London: George Harrap, 1928. Reprinted, New York: Da Capo Press, 1978.

External links

Dame Clara Butt – The Complete Discography, trevormidgley.com
Profile, cantabile-subito.de
Family photo
The Lost Chord, wcomarchive.org.uk
 
 Clara Butt recordings at the Discography of American Historical Recordings.

1872 births
1936 deaths
Alumni of the Royal College of Music
British women in World War I
Dames Commander of the Order of the British Empire
English contraltos
Operatic contraltos
People from Southwick, West Sussex
Royal Philharmonic Society Gold Medallists
Singers awarded knighthoods